Chumachenko or Chumachenco (Ukrainian, Russian: Чумаче́нко) is a surname of Ukrainian origins. It may refer to:

 Alisa Chumachenko, Lithuanian entrepreneur
 Ihor Chumachenko (born 1976), Ukrainian and Belarusian footballer
 Kateryna Yushchenko (born Catherine Claire Chumachenko in 1961), second wife of former Ukrainian president Viktor Yushchenko
 Mikhail Chumachenko, Ukrainian separatist
 Nicolas Chumachenco (1944–2020), Polish-born violinist
 Pavel Chumachenko (born 1971), Russian shot putter
 Sergei Chumachenko (born 1973), Russian footballer
 Yevgeni Chumachenko (born 1975), Russian footballer

See also
 

Ukrainian-language surnames